The lesser tube-nosed fruit bat or unstriped tube-nosed bat (Paranyctimene raptor) is a species of megabat in the family Pteropodidae found in West Papua, Indonesia and Papua New Guinea.

Taxonomy 
First described by George H. H. Tate in 1942, the species was re-diagnosed when a sympatric species was described in 2001. The first description did not adequately exclude the new species, and specimens previously recorded as Paranyctimene raptor may have been misdiagnosed. The 2001 revision re-allocated specimens from the type locality, and did not recognise the taxon Paranyctimene except as a subgenus of Nyctimene.

References

Paranyctimene
Bats of Oceania
Mammals of Papua New Guinea
Mammals of Western New Guinea
Mammals described in 1942
Taxonomy articles created by Polbot
Bats of Indonesia
Taxa named by George Henry Hamilton Tate
Bats of New Guinea